August Burns Red Presents: Sleddin' Hill, A Holiday Album is the fifth studio album, the first Christmas album and the first instrumental album by American metalcore band August Burns Red. It was released on October 9, 2012, through Solid State Records and was produced by Carson Slovak.

Background
The album was announced on Solid State's website on August 7, 2012.

Discussing the album, lead guitarist J.B. Brubaker said he was able "to get a little more wild" with his influences and that one of the solos was an ode to Blue Album-era Weezer. He also said that his punk influences are evident all over the album.

"Flurries" was the first song released from the album for streaming. It was released online on August 31, 2012.

"Sleigh Ride" was the second song released from the album. It was released on September 18, 2012 to online retailers. The song was one of the last songs to be recorded for the album due to "its crazy song structure and various key changes", guitarist J.B. Brubaker said. The song features a jazz section in the middle with a horn section.

Track listing
All songs arranged by JB Brubaker. All songs are public domain, unless otherwise stated.

Personnel
Credits adapted from AllMusic.

August Burns Red
 Jake Luhrs – vocals (track 7)
 JB Brubaker – lead guitar, vocals, banjo (track 7)
 Brent Rambler – rhythm guitar, vocals (track 7)
 Matt Greiner – drums, piano, vocals (track 7)
 Dustin Davidson – bass guitar, vocals (track 7)

Additional musicians
 Zachary Veilleux – piano (track 3)
 Taylor Brandt – violin (tracks 3, 6, 7 & 13)
 Ailie Herr – additional violin (track 13)
 Grant MacFarland – additional drums and percussion (tracks 3 & 5), cello (tracks 6 & 13)
 Jason Welsh – tuba (track 13), trumpet (tracks 3 & 13)
 Lancaster Bible College Vocal Choir – vocals (track 6)
 Dr. Robert Bigley – vocal choir writing, direction (track 6)

Additional personnel
 Carson Slovak – producer

Charts

References

2012 Christmas albums
August Burns Red albums
Solid State Records albums
Christmas albums by American artists